Morningside Cemetery is in Malone, New York

Burials
 Benjamin S. W. Clark (1829–1912)
 William Henry Flack (1861–1907)
 Clarence Evans Kilburn
 William C. Stevens (1848–1897), New York assemblyman
 William A. Wheeler (1819–1887) served as Vice President of the United States under Rutherford Hayes.
 Orville H. Gibson (1856–1918) Luthier, inventor, innovator and founder of the Gibson Mandolin-Guitar Manufacturing Co., which ultimately became the Gibson Guitar Corporation.

References

External links
 

Cemeteries in Franklin County, New York